Ghada Jamal may refer to:
 Ghada Jamal (presenter)
 Ghada Jamal (artist)